John Bitchener  (1864 – 10 March 1952) was a Reform Party Member of Parliament in New Zealand. He was a cabinet minister from 1933 to 1935 in the Reform Government of New Zealand.

Early life
Bitchener was born in 1864 in Stagsden, Bedfordshire, England. His father was Alfred Bitchener, who was born in 1844 in Cranfield, Bedfordshire, England. His mother was Mary Ann Bitchener (née Welch), and his parents had married on 9 February 1864. John Bitchener had two younger sisters. After his wife's death, Alfred Bitchener decided to emigrate to New Zealand together with his sister Anne, who had married a brother of his late wife. The Bitchener and Welch families arrived in Lyttelton Harbour in January 1875 on the Lady Jocelyn and the Welchs had two infants at the time.

Alfred Bitchener moved to the Waimate District and worked as a farm labourer for three or four years, and then became a saw milling contractor. John Bitchener received his education at Waimate Public School and then joined his father as a contractor in Waimate, before moving to Southland for four years.

Public roles

Like his father, John Bitchener joined many organisations and took leading roles. He was chairman of the Hook School Committee, he was a member of the Waimate County Council for eleven years, was a member of the Timaru Boys' High School Board including chairman for some time, was a member of the Timaru Harbour Board, was on the Waimate High School Board, and was president of the South Canterbury Farmers' Union. He was a member of the Advisory Board of the Farmers' Union in Wellington, was chairman of the Waimate Cooperative Flour Milling Company, and a director of the Canterbury Farmers' Cooperative Association.

He was elected as Member of Parliament for Waitaki in the 1919 general election, but was defeated in 1935. He was Minister of Works under George Forbes from 10 April 1933 to 6 December 1935, when the Coalition Government was defeated.

In 1935, he was awarded the King George V Silver Jubilee Medal. In the 1950 New Year Honours, Bitchener was appointed an Officer of the Order of the British Empire for public and municipal services.

Family
While living in Southland, Bitchener married Mary Laughton from Scotland in Invercargill in 1887. Their son was John Alfred Bitchener. They had a daughter, Jessie Laughton Bitchener, who died on 6 December 1895 at age four. Another daughter, Eva Laughton Bitchener, lived until old age and died in 1985 aged 89. His father, Alfred Bitchener, died suddenly in January 1918 at Waimate. His wife, Mary, died on 17 August 1946. John Bitchener died on 10 March 1952. Apart from John Alfred Bitchener, all of these are buried in the Bitchener family grave at Old Waimate Cemetery.

Notes

References
 

|-

1864 births
1952 deaths
Reform Party (New Zealand) MPs
Members of the Cabinet of New Zealand
Members of the New Zealand House of Representatives
New Zealand MPs for South Island electorates
New Zealand Officers of the Order of the British Empire
Unsuccessful candidates in the 1935 New Zealand general election
People from the Borough of Bedford
People from Waimate
English emigrants to New Zealand
Burials at Waimate Cemetery